A bassist (also known as a bass player or bass guitarist) is a musician who plays a bass instrument such as a double bass (upright bass, contrabass, wood bass), bass guitar (electric bass, acoustic bass), synthbass, keyboard bass or a low brass instrument such as a tuba or trombone. Different musical genres tend to be associated with one or more of these instruments. Since the 1960s, the electric bass has been the standard bass instrument for funk, R&B, soul music, rock and roll, reggae, jazz fusion, heavy metal, country and pop music. The double bass is the standard bass instrument for classical music, bluegrass, rockabilly, and most genres of jazz. Low brass instruments such as the tuba or sousaphone are the standard bass instrument in Dixieland and New Orleans-style jazz bands.

Despite the associations of different bass instruments with certain genres, there are exceptions. Some new rock bands and bassist used a double bass, such as Lee Rocker of Stray Cats, Barenaked Ladies and Tiger Army. Larry Graham, Bernard Edwards, Mick Hogan, Andy Fraser, and Mel Schacher used electric bass guitar. Some funk, R&B and jazz, fusion groups use synth bass or keyboard bass rather than electric bass. Bootsy Collins, Stevie Wonder, Kashif and Kevin McCord(One Way) used synth bass. Some Dixieland bands use double bass or electric bass instead of a tuba. In some jazz groups and jam bands, the basslines are played by a Hammond organ player, who uses the bass pedal keyboard or the lower manual for the low notes. Keyboard driven bass also occurs occasionally in rock bands, such as The Doors and Atomic Rooster.

Electric bass players 

Electric bassists play the bass guitar. In most rock, pop, metal and country genres, the bass line outlines the harmony of the music being performed, while simultaneously indicating the rhythmic pulse. In addition, there are many different standard bass line types for different genres and types of song (e.g. blues ballad, fast swing, etc.). Bass lines often emphasize the root note, with a secondary role for the third, and fifth of each chord being used in a given song. In addition, pedal tones (repeated or sustained single notes), ostinatos, and bass riffs are also used as bass lines. While most electric bass players rarely play chords (three or more notes all sounded at the same time), chords are used in some styles, especially funk, R&B, soul music, jazz, Latin and heavy metal music.

Double bass players

Classical double bass players 
See the List of contemporary classical double bass players.

Jazz double-bass players 

See the List of jazz bassists, which includes both double bass and electric bass players.

Popular music double bass players 
See the List of double bassists in popular music, which includes blues, folk, country, etc.

See also 
List of double bassists in popular music

References 

Occupations in music
Bass (sound)